History of Iran Narrated by Setar is a musical album being produced by Mehdi Rajabian. In this album the history of Iran has been played (narrated by setar) in multiple tracks by Mehdi Rajabian's specialized instrument, Setar. The musical pieces in this album are inspired by the historical atmosphere of Iran; the composer has done field research and recorded the sounds of different parts of Iran in order to create this album.

The album's confiscation and the banning 
On 5 October 2013, the security forces of Iran shut down the studio owned by Mehdi Rajabian, and banned his album and confiscated all the hard drives that contained its music tracks. The mentioned have not been returned to him to this day. On the day of arrest, Mehdi Rajabian was playing a piece called "War of Chaldaran".

References

External links
 PEN International
 Amnesty campaign
 Music free day
 An important spanish journal
 Freemuse
 Harana agency
 Coverage By Guardian
 Amnesty International
 Amnesty International UK Petition 
 Amnesty Switzerland Urgent Action
 Amnesty Deutschland Urgent Action
 International Campaign for Human Rights in Iran
 culture action europe
 Covereage by El Espanol
 Covereage by CNN Arabic
 Covereage by AL JAZEERA Arabic
 Arabic news reports on the imprisonment sentence of Mehdi Rajabian

Music & Arts albums
Mehdi Rajabian albums
Iranian music
Censored works